Zacualpan is a small town in the Mexican state of Nayarit,
It is bordered by Las Varas and San Isidro. It is a community that has experienced rapid growth due to tourism. The population was 4,468 in 2000.

This is a small town of some 4,000-5,000 residents. Most of the people living here are farmers or support the farming community. The town was founded by the Santana family, who owned much land around town, in the 1920s. Some members still reside in town or in the capital of the state whilst some left to California. The town is also home to many successful musical acts.

The town of zacualpan, is a place that has rich traditions and fiestas making it stand out among the surrounding towns. From the well-known traditions of the place, the town's patron saint festivals known as "La Santa Cruz" are celebrated. The town square is filled with rides, live music, dances and merchants. The party lasts for ten days, starting on April 24 and ending on May 3.

Another reason for which the town of Zacualpan is known, is for the rich devotion to the divine child of the Catholic Church, every first Sunday of each month, a special mass is held, where people from different places gather to the pilgrimage and mass commemorating the "holy miraculous child".

Within the popular music of the town the Sinaloan type band is found, but the Mariachi is also heard.

There is a wide variety of dishes, in which seafood, (ceviche, shaken fish, shrimp, etc.), beef, pork, goat and sheep are used as main ingredients.

The Zacualpan area is popular due to the nearby tourist sites, the town is part of the way to reach the beach, being located a few kilometers from the sea.

References 

Populated places in Nayarit